Nicolas Bonnal (born 16 October 1976) is a French former professional footballer who played as a midfielder and later worked as a manager.

References

1976 births
Living people
Association football midfielders
French footballers
AS Monaco FC players
AC Ajaccio players
ES Troyes AC players
Lille OSC players
Stade de Reims players
Ligue 1 players
Ligue 2 players
French football managers